Statistics of Emperor's Cup in the 1935 season.

Overview
It was contested by 6 teams, and Seoul Shukyu-dan won the championship.

Results

Quarterfinals
Tokyo Bunri University 4–2 Hokkaido University
Kansai University Club 4–2 Sendai S.C.

Semifinals
Tokyo Bunri University 3–0 Kansai University Club
Seoul Shukyu-dan 6–0 Nagoya Commercial College

Final

Tokyo Bunri University 1–6 Seoul Shukyu-dan
Seoul Shukyu-dan won the championship.

References
 NHK

Emperor's Cup
1935 in Japanese football